Dacrydium novo-guineense is a species of conifer in the family Podocarpaceae. It is found in Indonesia and Papua New Guinea.

References

novo-guineense
Least concern plants
Taxonomy articles created by Polbot
Taxobox binomials not recognized by IUCN